Lochinvar railway station is located on the Main Northern line in New South Wales, Australia. It serves the nearby town of Lochinvar opening on 2 July 1860.

It briefly served as the terminus of the Great Northern Railway when it was extended from Maitland. In March 1862 Lochinvar ceased to be a terminus when the line was extended to Greta.

Platforms & services

Lochinvar has two side platforms. It is serviced by NSW TrainLink Hunter Line services travelling between Newcastle, Muswellbrook and Scone.

Improvements
A second platform was added in 1914 when the line was duplicated. As part of the Australian Rail Track Corporation's project to install a third track between Maitland and Whittingham, the station's platforms were extended and a footbridge installed in 2012.

References

External links
Lochinvar station details Transport for New South Wales

Easy Access railway stations in New South Wales
Railway stations in the Hunter Region
Railway stations in Australia opened in 1860
Regional railway stations in New South Wales
Short-platform railway stations in New South Wales, 1 car or less
Main North railway line, New South Wales